Rajesh Kumar Bind (born 20 July 1994) is an Indian javelin thrower. He is the current Indian junior national record holder in javelin with a throw of 80.14 meters at the Junior National Championships in Lucknow in 2012. He was also named the best athlete at the games. He is supported by Olympic Gold Quest and Anglian Medal Hunt Company.

References

External links
 Rajesh Bind at the Olympic Gold Quest

Indian male javelin throwers
Athletes from Uttar Pradesh
Living people
1994 births